Means of Deliverance is the seventeenth solo album by the American composer Bill Laswell, released on October 16, 2012, by Innerhythmic.

Track listing

Personnel 
Adapted from the Means of Deliverance liner notes.
Musicians
Bill Laswell – acoustic bass guitar, sampler
Ejigayehu "Gigi" Shibabaw – vocals (5), producer
Technical personnel
James Dellatacoma – assistant engineer
Michael Fossenkemper – mastering
Robert Musso – engineering
Yoko Yamabe – cover art, design

Release history

References

External links 
 Means of Deliverance at Bandcamp
 

2012 albums
Bill Laswell albums